2005 Caribbean Football Union Club Championship was an international club football competition held in the Caribbean to determine the region's qualifier to the CONCACAF Champions' Cup. The 2005 edition included 13 teams from 10 football associations, contested on a two-legged basis.
Trinidad and Tobago champion North East Stars, which was only in its fourth year of existence, was given a bye to the quarterfinals. The club then withdrew before the quarterfinals due to a lack of financing. This allowed Surinamese champion Robinhood to eventually reach the final despite never playing a team from Jamaica or Trinidad and Tobago.
After Robinhood stunned Jamaican champion Portmore United with a first-leg victory, Portmore recovered to win the tournament with a decisive 4-0 win in the return leg, thereby advancing to the 2006 CONCACAF Champions' Cup.

First round

|}

Quarterfinals

Semifinals

Final

Portmore United 2005 CFU champions, advance to 2006 CONCACAF Champions' Cup quarterfinals.

Top scorers

References
 CONCACAF Results website.
 RSSSF results website

2005
1